Kenneth or Ken Ford may refer to:
 Ken Ford (sculptor) (born 1930), British sculptor
 Ken Ford (violinist) (born 1968), American jazz violinist
 Kenneth M. Ford (born 1955), American computer scientist
 Kenneth W. Ford (businessman) (1908–1997), American businessman who established Roseburg Forest Products
 Kenneth W. Ford (born 1926), American physicist, teacher, and author